Ian Gordon Morris (22 January 1957 – 7 October 2010) was a musician, record producer, recording engineer and songwriter from New Zealand.

Musical career
Ian Morris and his brother Richard (who would also go on to become a successful singer, songwriter and sound engineer in New Zealand under the name Rikki Morris) were born in England but emigrated with their family to New Zealand in 1966. They attended Sacred Heart College, Auckland.

Ian was a founding member of iconic New Zealand band Th' Dudes, formed at Sacred Heart in 1975. He had chart hits as a solo artist under the name Tex Pistol (a name he took on because "Ian Morris [didn't] sound poppy enough"), and in collaboration with his brother Rikki as Tex Pistol and Rikki Morris. As recording engineer and record producer, his production credits include a number of successful Kiwi artists: Hello Sailor, DD Smash, The Screaming Meemees, The Warratahs, When the Cat's Away, Greg Johnson, Dave Dobbyn, and Southside of Bombay to name a few. Morris also wrote numerous jingles, arrangements, and orchestrations.

Personal life 
Morris was married to singer Kim Willoughby of New Zealand's most successful all-female group When the Cat's Away, with whom he had two daughters, Julia and Maude, and a stepson, James. He was separated from his wife at the time of his death.

Death 
Morris had been suffering from depression and committed suicide at Te Pania Hotel in Napier on 7 October 2010. Police noted that there were no suspicious circumstances to his death.

Morris was posthumously inducted into the New Zealand Music Hall of Fame.

Discography

As solo artist

Albums

Singles

As producer

Awards

RIANZ

APRA 
In 2001, members of APRA were invited to vote on their favourite New Zealand songs of all time. Of the final 100, 2 Morris-related songs appeared on the list.
 #27, for "Be Mine Tonight" with Th' Dudes (1978)
 #50, for "Bliss" with Th' Dudes (1979)

See also
 Waikino music festival
 New Zealand music festivals
 Sweetwaters Music Festival

References

External links
 Ian Morris' igMusic website
 Th' Dudes official website
 Th' Dudes biography
 Th' Dudes
 1998 Rip It Up interview with Chris Bourke
 2001 Radio New Zealand interview, part one  and part two
 Ian Morris sound recording archive at the Alexander Turnbull Library

2010 suicides
APRA Award winners
New Zealand musicians
New Zealand songwriters
Male songwriters
New Zealand record producers
New Zealand audio engineers
1957 births
English emigrants to New Zealand
2010 deaths